Babette is a feminine given name. Notable people with the name include:

Babette Babich (born 1956), American philosopher
Babette Cole (1950–2017), English children's writer and illustrator
Babette Cochois (1725–1780), French ballerina
Babette DeCastro (1925–1992), one of the DeCastro Sisters singing trio
Babette Deutsch (1895–1982), American poet, critic, translator and novelist
Babette Josephs (1940–2021), American Democratic politician and attorney
Babette Mangolte, French-American cinematographer and film director
Babette March (born 1941), German-born American fashion model and the first Sports Illustrated Swimsuit Issue cover model
Babette or Barbara Ployer (1765–1811), Austrian piano and composition pupil of Mozart
Babette Preußler (born 1968), East German pair skater
Babette Rosmond (1921–1997), American author and editor
Babette Stephens (1910–2001), Australian actress and director
Babette van Teunenbroek (born 1960), Dutch cricketer
Babette van Veen (born 1968), Dutch actress and singer

Fictional characters 

Babette Dell, supporting character on The WB drama Gilmore Girls, portrayed by Sally Struthers
Babette Hersant, principal character of the 1987 Danish film Babette's Feast

Given names
Feminine given names
English-language feminine given names
English feminine given names
French feminine given names
Dutch feminine given names
German feminine given names